Stanley Cornwell Lewis MBE (18 December 1905 – 9 September 2009) was a British portrait painter and illustrator.

Biography
Lewis was born in Wales and studied at the Newport School of Art in Wales from 1923 to 1926.  He was then awarded a place at the Royal College of Art in London, where he studied from 1926 until 1930. In 1930 he won second prize in the Rome Scholarship Awards in Mural Painting, and later that year returned home to take up the post of Painting Master at Newport School of Art.  In 1939 World War II was declared and he was called up in 1941 for initial training in North Wales and joined the Searchlight Regiment of the Gloucestershire Regiment in Somerset.  After the war Stanley Lewis  became Principal of Carmarthen School of Art where he taught until his retirement in 1967.  Stanley Lewis, together with his wife, Minnie Lewis, were the author and illustrator of the book "Laugharne and Dylan Thomas", about their friend and neighbour, the poet Dylan Thomas. He held a three-man show at the Bruton Gallery with the sculptors Michael Ayrton and Enzo Plazzotta.

His painting The Welsh Molecatcher (1937) was voted the most popular picture at the Royal Academy Summer Exhibition that year. It hangs today at the Newport Museum and Art Gallery in Wales.   His  wartime painting of The Attack on the Battleship, Turpitz, is now at the Fleet Air Arm Museum at Yeovilton, Somerset.

Stanley Lewis exhibited the following pictures at Royal Academy Summer Exhibitions:
1932 – Portrait of Valerie, Portrait of Edith
1936 – Portrait of a Ploughman
1937 – The Welsh Mole Catcher, Portrait of Mrs Kirkley
1939 – Portrait of a Girl with a Rose
1940 – The Croesyceiliog Blacksmiths, The Doll
1955 – The Welsh Dresser
1961 – Horsepool Road, Laugharne
    
In the 2006 New Year Honours Lewis was awarded the MBE for services to the arts. Until his death he was working on an illustrated book of his wartime experiences.

References

External links
Newport Museum

1905 births
2009 deaths
20th-century Welsh painters
20th-century Welsh male artists
21st-century Welsh painters
21st-century Welsh male artists
Welsh centenarians
Men centenarians
British Army personnel of World War II
Welsh male painters